In enzymology, an agaritine gamma-glutamyltransferase is an enzyme that catalyzes the chemical reaction

agaritine + acceptor  4-hydroxymethylphenylhydrazine + gamma-L-glutamyl-acceptor

Thus, the two substrates of this enzyme are agaritine and acceptor, whereas its two products are 4-hydroxymethylphenylhydrazine and gamma-L-glutamyl-acceptor.

This enzyme belongs to the family of transferases, specifically the aminoacyltransferases.  The systematic name of this enzyme class is (gamma-L-glutamyl)-N1-(4-hydroxymethylphenyl)hydrazine:acceptor gamma-glutamyltransferase. Other names in common use include (gamma-L-glutamyl)-N1-(4-hydroxymethylphenyl)hydrazine:(acceptor), gamma-glutamyltransferase, (gamma-L-glutamyl)-1-N-(4-hydroxymethylphenyl)hydrazine:(acceptor), gamma-glutamyltransferase, (gamma-L-glutamyl)-1-N-(4-hydroxymethylphenyl)hydrazine:acceptor, and gamma-glutamyltransferase.

References

 

EC 2.3.2
Enzymes of unknown structure